The Monument to Joe Louis, known also as The Fist, is a memorial dedicated to boxer Joe Louis located at the intersection of Jefferson Avenue and Woodward Avenue in Detroit, near Hart Plaza.

History 

Dedicated on October 16, 1986, the sculpture, commissioned by Sports Illustrated from the Mexican-American sculptor Robert Graham (1938–2008), and poured by the legendary bronze artist, Rolf Kriken, is a  arm with a fisted hand suspended by a  pyramidal framework.  The sculpture weighs 5000 pounds and the total weight including the framework is 8000 pounds.

The inscription on the back of the arm reads:

MONUMENT
TO
JOE LOUIS
BY
ROBERT GRAHAM
A GIFT FROM SPORTS ILLUSTRATED
TO THE PEOPLE OF THE CITY OF
DETROIT. THE DETROIT INSTITUTE OF
ARTS AND ITS FOUNDERS SOCIETY
ON THE OCCASION OF THE MUSEUM'S
CENTENNIAL. 1885-1985.

It represents the power of his punch both inside and outside the ring. Because of Louis' efforts to fight Jim Crow laws, the fist was symbolically intended as a statement against racism. Graham referred to the sculpture as a "battering ram".  It is claimed to be an historical metaphor, even down to its placement (pointing toward Canada).

The sculpture was vandalized by two white men in 2004, who covered it in white paint and left a sign which read, "Courtesy of Fighting Whities". Graham responded that the piece was "working" if it aroused passion.

References

Tourist attractions in Detroit
1986 sculptures
Bronze sculptures in Michigan
Sculptures of African Americans
1986 establishments in Michigan
Vandalized works of art in Michigan
Statues of sportspeople
Cultural depictions of Joe Louis